Esther Puakela Kiaʻāina (born July 16, 1963) is a Native Hawaiian politician who currently serves on the Honolulu City Council as its Vice Chair and represents District 3 on the island of Oʻahu (Waimānalo, Kailua and Kāneʻohe). She was elected on November 3, 2020, and began her tenure on January 2, 2021. She is Chair of the Planning and the Economy Committee and Vice Chair of the Committee on Housing, Sustainability, and Health.

Early life and education

Kia'āina is the daughter of parents Lorelei Haunani Anahu and Melvin Leialoha Kia'āina. She was born and raised on the island of Guam where her father served as a civilian in the U.S. Navy and later returned to her parents’ homeland of Hawai‘i, where she graduated from the Kamehameha Schools. 

Kia'āina received her B.A. from the University of Southern California in International Relations and Political Science, and her J.D. from the George Washington University Law School. She also attended  Waseda University in Tokyo, Japan, and the Johns Hopkins University School of Advanced International Studies.

Political career
After graduating from the University of Southern California in 1985, Kia'āina served as a volunteer-intern to Hawai‘i U.S. Senator Daniel Inouye in Washington, D.C. She also worked for Hawai‘i U.S. Senator Daniel Akaka during the 1990s, and as a Chief of Staff for U.S. Delegate Robert Underwood of Guam and U.S. Representative Ed Case.

In Hawai‘i, Kia'āina served as a Land Asset Manager at her alma mater, Kamehameha Schools, for two years before moving on in 2009 to work as chief advocate for the Office of Hawaiian Affairs.

In 2012, Kia'āina ran to represent Hawaii's 2nd congressional district in the United States Congress, following the retirement of U.S. Representative Mazie Hirono, who had decided to run for United States Senate following the retirement of Senator Akaka. She was one of six candidates and placed third, losing to Representative-elect Tulsi Gabbard and former Mayor of Honolulu Mufi Hannemann.

On October 15, 2012, Neil Abercrombie, the Governor of Hawai‘i, appointed her to the Hawai'i Department of Land and Natural Resources, an office that was left vacant following the resignation of Guy Kaulukukui.

Following the death of Senator Inouye, who had represented the State of Hawai‘i since its founding, the Hawai‘i Democratic Party was given the ability to choose three possible replacements to recommend to Governor Abercrombie. On December 26, 2012, the party met and chose the three contenders. Kia'āina, Hawai‘i U.S. Representative Colleen Hanabusa (Inouye's requested choice), and Lieutenant Governor of Hawaii Brian Schatz were selected for recommendation. To prevent a long vacancy during the United States fiscal cliff budget negotiations, Abercrombie made his decision quickly, per the request of U.S. Senate Majority Leader Harry Reid: Schatz was chosen to fill Inouye's seat until a special election in 2014.

Kia'āina was nominated by President Barack Obama to lead the Office of Insular Affairs as Assistant Secretary of the Interior for Insular Areas on September 11, 2013.  She was confirmed by the U.S. Senate on June 26, 2014. In May 2016, Obama designated Kia'āina to simultaneously to also serve as his White House representative for the 902 Consultations between the United States and the Commonwealth of the Northern Mariana Islands. She resigned March 2017.

References

External links
Official website of the Hawai'i Department of Land and Natural Resources

1963 births
American people of Native Hawaiian descent
George Washington University Law School alumni
Hawaii Democrats
Johns Hopkins University alumni
Kamehameha Schools alumni
Living people
USC School of International Relations alumni
United States Department of the Interior officials
Guamanian people of Native Hawaiian descent